is a Japanese pharmaceutical and biotechnology company under the Kirin Holdings, and is among the 40 largest in the world by revenue. The company is headquartered in Chiyoda-ku, Tokyo and is a  member of the Nikkei 225 stock index.

History
On July 1, 1949 the forerunner of the present company, Kyowa Hakko Kogyo Co., Ltd. is established. Following the merger with Kirin Pharma Co., Ltd., on October 1, 2008 the company changed its name to its present.

On July 11, 2014, the KHK subsidiary, ProStrakan Group (based in Scotland), acquired Archimedes Pharma from the Novo Nordisk Foundation for $394 million 

In 2019, the entity was renamed "Kyowa Kirin Co., Ltd.", replacing its prior name of Kyowa Hakko Kirin Co., Ltd.

In November 2022, Kyowa Kirin announced plans to spin its international established medicines portfolio into a new joint venture with German company Grünenthal.

Business segments and products
 Pharmaceuticals business
The company developed a method to make afucosylated monoclonal antibodies using a CHO cell line in which FUT8 has been knocked out; the company calls this its "Potelligent" platform. The company gained marketing approval in Japan in April 2012 for a monoclonal antibody drug called mogamulizumab which was developed using the platform.

 Central nervous system medicines
 Immunology/Allergy medicines
 Nephrology medicines
ESPO / NESP / Aranesp
REGPARA
 Oncology medicines 
 ABSTRAL
 GRAN / Peglasta / Neulasta
 LEUNASE
 Mitomycin-C
 SANCUSO
 Diagnostics
 In vitro diagnostic reagents, analyzers and companion diagnostics
 Bio-Chemicals business
 Biosimilars
 Monoclonal Antibodies
 Amino acids, nucleic acids and related compounds, health care products and other active pharmaceutical ingredients
 Vitamins, minerals, peptides and plant growth regulators

References

External links

 

Biopharmaceutical companies
Biotechnology companies of Japan
Pharmaceutical companies based in Tokyo
Companies listed on the Tokyo Stock Exchange
Pharmaceutical companies established in 1949
Pharmaceutical companies of Japan
1949 establishments in Japan
Japanese brands